The Brunt Ice Shelf borders the Antarctic coast of Coats Land between Dawson-Lambton Glacier and Stancomb-Wills Glacier Tongue. It was named by the UK Antarctic Place-names Committee after David Brunt, British meteorologist, Physical Secretary of the Royal Society, 1948–57, who was responsible for the initiation of the Royal Society Expedition to this ice shelf in 1955.

It was the location of the base of the Royal Society Expedition, 1955–59 which was taken over as the British Halley Research Station.

The icefalls were discovered on 5 November 1967, in the course of a United States Navy Squadron VXE-6 flight over the coast in LC-130 aircraft, and was plotted by the United States Geological Survey from air photos obtained at that time. It was named by the Advisory Committee on Antarctic Names in association with the Brunt Ice Shelf.

Calving events
In 2012, previously stable large chasms in the ice shelf (cracks which clearly go all the way through to the sea) started expanding, which was expected to cause large parts of the Brunt Ice Shelf to break off within the next few years. On 26 February 2021, the  Iceberg A-74 duly broke away from the north-facing shelf, separating from the edge of the shelf at the McDonald Ice Rumples along the North Rift and finally joining the Brunt-Stancomb chasm.

On 23 January 2023, the second major calving from this area occurred when the crack known as Chasm-1 fully extended through the ice shelf, creating a  iceberg. Chasm-1 had continued to grow since 2015 and by December 2022 extended across the entire ice shelf, marking the beginning of the calving event.

See also
 Brunt Basin
 Emperor Bay
 List of glaciers
 List of Antarctic ice shelves
 List of Antarctic field camps

References

External links
 

Ice shelves of Antarctica
Bodies of ice of Coats Land